Alena Murang (born 1989) is a Malaysian singer-songwriter, sape player, visual artist and educator who sings in endangered languages including Kelabit and Kenyah. She is one of the first women to play the sape, a lute instrument from Borneo traditionally (pre-1930s) reserved for male healers.

Early life and background
Murang is born and bred in Kuching, Sarawak to Italian-English mother and Kelabit father. She started playing the sape at the age of 10, from renowned sape master Matthew Ngau Jau. She graduated with a First Class BSc (Hons) management degree from the Manchester Business School, University of Manchester. She went on to work in management consulting at PricewaterhouseCoopers, focusing on environmental sustainability, before leaving to study visual arts for a year in Singapore. Prior to pursuing music full-time, she worked as strategy manager for not-for-profit organization, Teach for Malaysia.

Career
Murang made her debut as an artiste in 2016 with the release of EP, Flight. She never formally studied music, but has been learning the dance, songs, and music from her elders. She has performed at many renowned world music festivals including the SXSW (USA), Colors of Ostrava (Czech Republic), Paris Fashion Week (France), Rudolstadt-Festival (Germany), OzAsia Festival (Australia), and Rainforest World Music Festival (Malaysia). She was a youth representative at the UNESCO Youth Forum in Paris, and UNESCO Asia-Pacific for her work in intangible cultural heritage.

She was listed in Tatler Asia's list of Most Influential Malaysia in 2021 and Gen.T Malaysia in 2018 & 2019.

Discography
 Flight (EP) (2016)
 Sky Songs (2021)

Filmography

Awards and accolades

References

External links

Wind Music Artist's Profile

1990 births
Living people
21st-century Malaysian women singers
People from Kuching
People from Sarawak
Kelabit people
Malaysian people of Italian descent
Malaysian people of English descent
Malaysian women singer-songwriters